To Go Home is an EP released by M. Ward in 2007 for Merge Records. The title track, originally by Daniel Johnston, is also found on M. Ward's 2006 album Post-War.

Track listing
All songs by Matt Ward except where noted.

 "To Go Home" (Daniel Johnston) – 4:04
 "Cosmopolitan Pap" – 1:58
 "Human Punching Bag" – 3:04
 "Headed for a Fall" (Jimmie Dale Gilmore) – 5:32

2007 EPs
M. Ward albums